Marius Visser (born 24 April 1982 in Walvis Bay) is a rugby union player for Namibia and the heaviest player at the 2007 Rugby World Cup at 140 kilograms. While due to play for the Lyon team subsequent to the World Cup, he retired after the discovery of irreversible spinal problems.

In 2009, he returned to the Namibian national team, apparently able to continue playing after earlier worries that injury ended his career.

References

External links
Player statistics

1982 births
Living people
Border Bulldogs players
Namibia international rugby union players
Namibian Afrikaner people
Namibian people of Dutch descent
Namibian rugby union players
Rugby union players from Walvis Bay
White Namibian people
Rugby union props